The Cerberean Cauldron is a caldera in Australia  which erupted about 374 million years ago and  It forms the northern part of the Marysville Igneous Complex in central Victoria and is now in the Lake Eildon National Park.

References

Calderas of Oceania
Devonian calderas
Supervolcanoes
Volcanoes of Victoria (Australia)